RAF Fighter Command was one of the commands of the Royal Air Force. It was formed in 1936 to allow more specialised control of fighter aircraft. It served throughout the Second World War. It earned near-immortal fame during the Battle of Britain in 1940, when the Few held off the Luftwaffe attack on Britain. The Command continued until 17 November 1943, when it was disbanded and the RAF fighter force was split into two categories; defence and attack. The defensive force became Air Defence of Great Britain (ADGB) and the offensive force became the RAF Second Tactical Air Force. Air Defence of Great Britain was renamed back to Fighter Command in October 1944 and continued to provide defensive patrols around Great Britain. It was disbanded for the second time in 1968, when it was subsumed into the new Strike Command.

Origins 
On 20 May 1926, the forerunner of Fighter Command was established as a group within Inland Area. On 1 June 1926, Fighting Area was transferred to the Air Defence of Great Britain. Fighting Area was raised to Command status in 1932 and renamed Fighter Command on 1 May 1936. On 23 February 1940, No. 60 Group RAF was established within Fighter Command to control Chain Home radar detection and tracking units.

Second World War

Battle of Britain 

Over the next few years, the Command expanded greatly and replaced its obsolete biplane squadrons – generally outfitted with Bristol Bulldog, Gloster Gauntlet and Hawker Fury biplane fighters leading up to, and through the period of its founding – with two of the most famous aircraft ever to fly with the RAF, the Hawker Hurricane and the Supermarine Spitfire. The supreme test of Fighter Command came during the Battle of Britain in the summer of 1940 when the German Luftwaffe launched an offensive aimed at attaining air superiority over the Channel and the UK as a prerequisite to the launch of a seaborne invasion force (codenamed Operation Sea Lion). Fighter Command was divided into a number of Groups, each defending a different part of the UK. 11 Group took the brunt of the German attack, as it controlled southeast England and London. It was reinforced by 10 Group, which covered southwest England, 12 Group, which covered the Midlands and East Anglia and 13 Group which covered the North of England and Scotland. 14 Group was established on 26 June 1940. 60 Group was established to run the Chain Home radar stations in early 1940. In the end, the Germans failed to attain air superiority, although the RAF had been eating severely into its reserves during the battle, as had the Luftwaffe.

1941 air offensive 

By May 1941, the squadrons based at all the main fighter airfields operated in wings, under the tactical control of the new post of wing leader, a survivor of 1940 with the rank of wing commander. Fighter Command began a campaign to gain air superiority over northwestern France. Various types of short-penetration fighter operations were used to draw the  into a war of attrition and keep as many German fighters in the west, particularly after the Operation Barbarossa, the German attack on the Soviet Union began in June 1941. Large Spitfire formations were sent out with small numbers of medium bombers to lure the German fighters into combat. The  left Jagdgeschwader 2 (JG 2) and Jagdgeschwader 26 (JG 26) in western Europe, comprising 180 fighters at most.

The advantages enjoyed by Fighter Command during the Battle of Britain were reversed, the short range of the Spitfire becoming a tactical disadvantage and British pilots became prisoner of war if shot down. Fighter Command claimed 711  fighters shot down but only 236 were lost from all causes, 103 in combat, for a loss of 400 RAF fighters. As 1941 ended, the appearance of the new Focke-Wulf Fw 190, considerably superior to the Spitfire Mk V, put the British fighters at a worse disadvantage.

The Blitz of 1940 continued against civilian and industrial targets. Fighter Command night defences improved considerably in the new year; the Bristol Beaufighter supplanted the Bristol Blenheim as the principal night fighter, equipped with improved Airborne Interception radar and became increasingly effective in ground-controlled interception (GCI). More anti-aircraft guns and searchlights were fitted with radar sets, which improved accuracy.  losses mounted from 28 in January 1941 to 124 in May, when transfers of German bomber units to eastern Europe for the forthcoming Operation Barbarossa ended the Blitz in May 1941.

1942–45 

The difficult task of slowly grinding down the Germans continued into 1942 and 1943. Squadrons also found themselves on tiring defensive patrols as small formations of Fw 190s flew 'hit and run' nuisance raids all along the south coast and the Hawker Typhoon came into squadron service. On 19 August, during the Dieppe Raid, the RAF had an opportunity to engage large numbers of  aircraft. Postwar analysis showed that the RAF lost 106 aircraft, including 88 fighters and 18 bombers; 29 fighter losses were from flak, one ran out of fuel, two collided and one was a victim of friendly fire. The real  loss was 48 aircraft were lost, 28 being bombers, half of them Dornier Do 217s from KG 2. JG 2, lost 14 Fw 190s and eight pilots killed, JG 26 lost six Fw 190s with their pilots. Spitfire losses stood at 70 destroyed and damaged to all causes; the number lost to Fw 190s is unknown. The  claimed 61 of the 106 RAF machines lost, which included all types, JG 2 claiming 40 and JG 26 claiming 21. In 1942 Fighter Command claimed 560 victories against a true loss of 272 German fighters from all causes, for 574 RAF day fighters destroyed.

By the autumn of 1942, the arrival of the United States Army Air Forces (USAAF) 8th Air Force and its daylight bombers would add bomber escort to Fighter Command's tasks. Until American Republic P-47 Thunderbolt fighter groups were operational in May 1943, the Command's Spitfires performed a vital role in protecting the increasing numbers of Boeing B-17 Flying Fortresses and Consolidated B-24 Liberators operating over Occupied Europe. The Spitfire's chronic lack of operational range – not entirely unlike the Bf 109E's similar dilemma during the Battle of Britain – however meant such protection was limited to the Channel and the European coast.

In 1943, Fighter Command was split into the Air Defence of Great Britain (ADGB), the former name of Fighter Command, to defend Britain and the Second Tactical Air Force to support ground forces after the invasion of Europe. The same year, No. 14 Group RAF (established 26 June 1940) was disestablished, on 15 July. In 1944 ADGB made the greatest effort in its history during Operation Overlord, the invasion of France which began on 6 June 1944. RAF and Allied fighter units suppressed the meagre German air opposition and supported ground forces by strafing German positions and transport. Later in the year, the final test of ADGB (renamed Fighter Command in October 1944) in the war occurred against the V-1 flying bomb during Operation Crossbow. RAF fighters also flew long-range night intruder operations against German airfields and aircraft (e.g., at take-off/landing) at the time the  night fighters would be scrambled against RAF Bomber Command (see Operation Hydra).

In January 1945, the command included 10, 11, 12 and 13 Groups, plus 38 (Airborne Forces) Group, 60 Group, and 70 (Training) Group. 10 Group was disestablished on 2 May 1945, and 70 Group on 17 July 1945. In 1946, 60 Group was amalgamated with 26 Group to become 90 (Signals) Group and transferred to Transport Command/British Air Force of Occupation. From 1939 to 1945, RAF Fighter Command lost 3,690 killed, 1,215 wounded and 601 POW; 4,790 aircraft were lost.

Royal Observer Corps 
As a direct result of their efforts during the Battle of Britain the Observer Corps was granted the title Royal by King George VI and became a uniformed volunteer branch of the RAF from April 1941 for the remainder of its existence, retitled the Royal Observer Corps (ROC). The corps would continue as a civilian organisation but wearing a Royal Air Force uniform and administered by Fighter Command.

With their headquarters at RAF Bentley Priory, the ROC remained administered by Fighter Command until 31 March 1968, when responsibility was handed over to the newly formed RAF Strike Command.

The ROC was a defence warning organisation operating in the United Kingdom between 1925 and 31 December 1995, when it was stood down.  Initially established for an aircraft recognition and reporting role that lasted through both world wars, the organisation switched to a Cold War nuclear reporting role during the 1950s. The 10,500 ROC volunteers were trained and administered by a small cadre of 69 uniformed full-time professional officers under the command of a serving RAF Air Commodore.

Cold War years 

In the aftermath of World War II, the role of Fighter Command was still to protect the UK from air attack. Only the threat had changed, from Germany to the Soviet Union. The Cold War saw the threat of Soviet bombers attacking the United Kingdom loom large. A Canadian fighter wing, No. 1 Wing, arrived at RAF North Luffenham in late 1951 to bolster NATO's strength, and was in a position to assist Fighter Command until it relocated to bases in France and West Germany in 1954–55. After 1949, those Soviet bombers could be carrying nuclear weapons, and so intercepting them was crucial if the United Kingdom was to be saved during a war. A long succession of fighter aircraft saw service with Fighter Command during the 1950s and 1960s. Particularly notable types were the Gloster Meteor, Hawker Hunter, Gloster Javelin and the English Electric Lightning.

The Lightning was the only purely British supersonic aircraft to enter service. That was due to a disastrous defence review in 1957. During the mid-1950s, the performance of the new surface to air missiles was improving at an enormous rate. Duncan Sandys, the Minister of Defence at the time needed to find cuts in the British defence budget, since the UK was in serious danger of being bankrupted by its defence spending. The rate of improvement of surface to air missiles seemed to indicate that they would soon be able to shoot any manned aircraft out of the sky. Consequently, in an infamous statement in the 1957 Defence White Paper the Sandys review declared that manned aircraft were obsolescent and would soon become obsolete. All programmes for manned aircraft that were not too far along were cancelled. The Lightning was the only one of a number of new supersonic aircraft that was too far along to cancel. That decision, combined with the increasing costs of developing aircraft crippled the British aircraft industry and made Fighter Command and the RAF reliant on foreign or jointly developed aircraft.

In 1961, RAF Fighter Command was assigned to NATO's air defence system. On 1 May, Air Officer Commanding in Chief, Fighter Command, Air Marshal Sir Hector McGregor assumed the additional title of Commander United Kingdom Air Defence Region. The ADR itself stretched some hundreds of miles to the north, west and south of the country and almost to the continental coastline in the east.

In organisational terms, Nos 11 (14 July 1936 – 31 December 1960, 1 January 1961 - 1 April 1963) and 12 Groups (1 April 1937 – 31 March 1963) continued in almost unbroken service until 1963. No.13 Group (15 March 1939 – 20 May 1946) was reformed on 16 May 1955 and then disbanded 31 December 1961 at RAF Ouston (becoming 11 Group). From 1 April 1963 three sectors, No. 11 Sector RAF; No. 12 Sector RAF; and No. 13 Sector RAF were maintained. 13 Sector disbanded by amalgamation with No. 11 Sector on 17 March 1965.

Strike Command 
As the 1960s dawned, the RAF continued to shrink. The three functional commands, Fighter Command, Bomber Command, and Coastal Command had all been formed in 1936 to help command an expanding RAF. It was now becoming clear that the RAF was simply becoming too small to justify their continued existence as separate entities. Consequently, in 1968, Fighter Command and Bomber Command were joined together to form Strike Command, both becoming groups within the new command. Coastal Command was disbanded and subsumed into the new Strike Command in November 1969.

Air Officers Commanding-in-Chief

See also 

 List of Royal Air Force commands

References

Notes

Bibliography 

 Austin, A.B. Fighter Command. London: Victor Gollancz, 1941.
 Bowyer, Chaz. RAF Fighter Command, 1936–1968. BCA/J.M. Dent, 1980. .
 Delve, Ken. Fighter Command 1936–1968: An Operational and Historical Record. Pen & Sword Aviation, 2007. .
 Delve, Ken. The Source Book of the RAF. Shrewsbury, Shropshire, UK: Airlife Publishing Ltd., 1994. .
 Franks, Norman L.R. RAF Fighter Command, 1936–1968. HarperCollins Publishers Ltd., 1992. .
 Franks, Norman L.R. Royal Air Force Losses of the Second World War, Volume 2. Operational Losses: Aircraft and crews, 1942–1943. London: Midland Publishing Limited, 1998. .
 Franks, Norman L.R. Royal Air Force Losses of the Second World War, Volume 3. Operational Losses: Aircraft and crews, 1944–1945 (Incorporating Air Defence Great Britain and 2nd TAF). London: Midland Publishing Limited, 1998. .
 
 James, T.C.G. and Sebastian Cox. Growth of Fighter Command, 1936–1940: v. 1: Air Defence of Great Britain: v. 1 (Royal Air Force Official Histories). Routledge, 2001. .
 Jefford, C.G. RAF Squadrons, a Comprehensive Record of the Movement and Equipment of all RAF Squadrons and their Antecedents since 1912. Shrewsbury, Shropshire, UK: Airlife Publishing, 1998 (second edition 2001). .
 
 
 Wykeham, Peter. Fighter Command. London: Putnam, 1960.

|-

Battle of Britain
Military units and formations established in 1936
Military units and formations disestablished in 1968
Fighter Command
Allied air commands of World War II